Matthew Hebden Porteus is Sutardja Chuk Professor of Definitive and Curative Medicine at Stanford University. In 2003, as a postdoctoral fellow in David Baltimore's lab at the California Institute of Technology, Porteus was the first to demonstrate precise gene editing in human cells using chimeric nucleases.

He graduated magna cum laude from Harvard University and completed his MD and PhD at Stanford University. For his post-doctoral work he trained with David Baltimore at MIT and Caltech. He is a scientific founder of CRISPR Therapeutics and an academic founder of Graphite Bio.

He has an h-index of 60 according to Google Scholar.

References

External links

Year of birth missing (living people)
Living people
Harvard University alumni
Stanford University alumni
University of Texas Southwestern Medical Center faculty
Stanford University faculty